Carola Wolff is a German former competitive figure skater who represented West Germany. She is the 1987 Nebelhorn Trophy silver medalist, the 1987 Novarat Trophy silver medalist, and a two-time German national bronze medalist. She finished in the top ten at the 1990 European Championships in Leningrad.

Competitive highlights

References 

German female single skaters
Living people
Year of birth missing (living people)
Place of birth missing (living people)